Orphans of the Genocide, is a 2013 television film written and directed by American-Armenian filmmaker Bared Maronian. Filmed was premiered in 2015 at the 100th anniversary of the Armenian genocide. The heroes of the film who tell their stories are the descendants of the genocide survivors.

Plot 
In the documentary an Armenian orphanage located at Antoura, Beirut, Lebanon was unveiled, where thousands of Armenian genocide orphans had lived and were forcefully  "Turkified" during World War I. Interviews of software engineer and historian Maurice Kelechian, Almast Boghossian, Jack Kevorkian, British journalist Robert Fisk, and Debórah Dwork are included in the film.

Author's remarks 
" The stories of the Armenian Genocide orphans that we highlight in the documentary are of universal proportions. Meaning, the experiences that the orphans of the Armenian Genocide went through are the same experiences (loss of family members, starvation, pain, epidemics such as typhus, social displacement) that the orphans of the Cambodian genocide, the Holocaust orphans, and the Darfur Genocide orphans went through. Therefore, the Armenian Genocide is not only an Armenian issue. It concerns all of the civilized world. A large number of scholars agree that, had the world paid closer attention to the Armenian Genocide – the first genocide of the 20th century – the genocides that followed it would have never happened. “ Bared Maronian

See also
 Armenian genocide
 Armenian genocide in culture
 Vorpahavak

References

External links
 
 Orphans of the Genocide
 Bared Maronian: Orphans of the Genocide 
 Documentary: Orphans of the Genocide

American television films
Armenian genocide films
2013 television films
2013 films
2010s English-language films